Mark Bradford Watson (born January 23, 1974) is an American former professional baseball pitcher. He played in Major League Baseball for the Cleveland Indians, Seattle Mariners, and Cincinnati Reds, and also played in Japan for the Hiroshima Toyo Carp.

Amateur career
A native of Atlanta, Georgia, Watson attended the Marist School in Brookhaven, Georgia. He was selected out of high school by the Los Angeles Dodgers in the 21st round of the 1993 MLB Draft but opted to attend Clemson University and the University of Georgia. In 1994, he played collegiate summer baseball in the Cape Cod Baseball League for the Yarmouth-Dennis Red Sox where he tossed a no-hitter and was named a league all-star. He was selected by the Florida Marlins in the 8th round of the 1995 MLB Draft, but did not sign.

Professional career
In 1996, Watson signed with the Milwaukee Brewers as an amateur free agent. In 1998, the Brewers traded him to Cleveland, and Watson made his major league debut with the Indians in 2000, appearing in six games for the big league club. Over the next three years, he made five more big league appearances, three with Seattle and two with Cincinnati. Over 12.1 career major league innings, Watson posted a 10.95 ERA with seven strikeouts and seven walks.

References

External links

1974 births
Living people
Major League Baseball pitchers
Cleveland Indians players
Seattle Mariners players
Cincinnati Reds players
Buffalo Bisons (minor league) players
Akron Aeros players
Clemson Tigers baseball players
Georgia Bulldogs baseball players
Kinston Indians players
Louisville Bats players
Baseball players from Atlanta
American expatriate baseball players in Japan
Hiroshima Toyo Carp players
Tacoma Rainiers players
Colorado Springs Sky Sox players
Iowa Cubs players
Sacramento River Cats players
Long Island Ducks players
Marist School (Georgia) alumni
Yarmouth–Dennis Red Sox players